The FIBA Women's World Ranking is the FIBA's rankings of national women's basketball teams. FIBA ranks women's national teams in both senior and junior competitions. It also publishes combined rankings for all competitions involving both sexes.

Calculation
Since November 2019, FIBA uses a game-based system similar to the men's ranking.

Until 2019
FIBA still uses the competition-based system to determine its women's rankings. As noted above, this system was also used to determine men's rankings prior to 2017. FIBA has announced that it will introduce a game-based ranking procedure similar to that currently used for men's rankings in the indeterminate future.

Events' weights
FIBA uses a weighted arithmetic mean to determine the statistical weight of each of the tournaments. Each event is assigned point weight that is based partly on how competitive the tournament is and partly on which national teams are participating:

Competition ranking points

As opposed to football tournaments, teams still have to go through a series of consolation and classification rounds even if they've been eliminated from title contention, so that a complete ranking of the teams will be possible.

Cycle and updates

The calculations are done after the tournaments stated above in a group of two Olympic cycles (8 years). The oldest tournament outside the 8-year period is discarded and replaced with the newest competition.

This means that in every computation, there are:
 Four continental championships
 Two FIBA Women's Basketball World Cups
 Two Olympic basketball tournaments

Example
The ' 1000.0 points were calculated by this method:

After the conclusion of the 2017 continental championships, the points gained from the 2009 continental championships were replaced with those gained from the 2017 editions.

References

External links
FIBA Women's World Ranking

World Rankings
Sports world rankings
Basketball rankings